Sir Roger Martin, 1st Baronet (c. 1639 – 8 July 1712) was son of Richard Martin and Jane, daughter of Sir Henry Bedingfield of Oxborough. He was created a baronet 28 March 1667 and was the first of the five Martin Baronets of Long Melford.

Personal life
In 1663 Sir Roger married Tamworth Horner (d. 15 August 1698), daughter of Edward Horner Esq. of Mells, Somerset and by her had eight sons and three daughters:
 Tamworth Martin (b. 1664) married Thomas Rookwood, Esq. and died giving birth to their only daughter, Elizabeth.
 Catherine Martin (b. 1666)
 Roger Martin (b. 1666) died in infancy
 Sir Roger Martin, 2nd Baronet (1667 – 3 March 1742) married Anna-Maria Harvey
 Edward Martin (1673 – 1710)
 Henry Martin (1674 – 1710)
 John Martin (1676 – 1715)
 Francis Martin (b. 1683) died in infancy
 Jermyn Martin (b. 1685) died in infancy
 Joseph Martin (1688 – 1715)
 Jane Martin (1688)

He died 8 July 1712 and was buried four days later in the cemetery of Holy Trinity Church in Long Melford.

References

1639 births
1712 deaths
People from Long Melford
Baronets in the Baronetage of England